Trichinochaeta is a genus of parasitic flies in the family Tachinidae.

Species
Trichinochaeta orbitalis Townsend, 1917

Distribution
Brazil.

References

Monotypic Brachycera genera
Diptera of North America
Exoristinae
Tachinidae genera
Taxa named by Charles Henry Tyler Townsend